Scotch College  is an independent, Presbyterian day and boarding school for boys, located in Hawthorn, an inner-eastern suburb of Melbourne, Victoria, Australia.

The college was established in 1851 as The Melbourne Academy in a house in Spring Street, Melbourne, by James Forbes of the Free Presbyterian Church of Victoria. It is the oldest extant secondary school in Victoria and celebrated its sesquicentenary in 2001.

Scotch is a founding member of the Associated Public Schools of Victoria (APS), and is affiliated with the International Boys' Schools Coalition (IBSC), the Junior School Heads Association of Australia (JSHAA), the Australian Boarding Schools' Association (ABSA), the Association of Independent Schools of Victoria (AISV), and the Headmasters' and Headmistresses' Conference. The School is a member of the Global Alliance of Leading-Edge Schools.

An investigation by The Age and The Sydney Morning Herald in 2021 found that Scotch is one of Australia's richest schools, and had the largest financial investment portfolio of any Australian school (valued at the time at more than $144 million).

History 

Scotch College is the oldest surviving secondary school in Victoria. Its foundation was due to the initiative of James Forbes, of the Free Presbyterian Church, who arrived in 1838 as the first settled Christian minister in what became the colony of Victoria in 1851. It is "the outcome of the old Scottish ideal of education", in which church and school were inextricably connected. The school opened on 6 October 1851, under the name of the Melbourne Academy in a small house in Spring Street, with Robert Lawson, a Scot from Edinburgh University, as the first principal. The house was soon outgrown, as was a larger one on the northwest corner of Spring and Little Collins Streets (later the Ulster Family Hotel) and the Church applied to the government for a grant of land. Two acres were reserved for the school on Eastern Hill and substantial new buildings were erected there in 1853. The cost was met partly by a government grant and partly from funds raised by the friends of the school.

Lawson resigned in 1856. Under his successor, Alexander Morrison, the school grew and prospered; it came under the oversight of the newly formed Presbyterian Church of Victoria in 1859. Morrison had been Rector of Hamilton Academy and remained at Scotch for 46 years, during almost all of which time his brother Robert was a master of the college. William Still Littlejohn, who took over the school in 1904, served for 29 years, and his successor, Colin Macdonald Gilray, for 19. So, when the school became the first in Victoria to celebrate its centenary, Gilray was only the fourth principal.

Gilray was succeeded in 1953 by R. Selby Smith, an Old Rugbeian who had served in the Royal Navy during the war and was at the time of his appointment Deputy Director of Education for Warwickshire. Smith resigned in 1964 to become the Foundation Dean of Education at Monash University.

C. O. Healey, who had been Headmaster of Sydney Grammar School since 1951, succeeded Smith. Healey retired in January 1975.

In the following May, P. A. V. Roff, formerly Headmaster of Scotch College, Adelaide, was installed as the seventh principal of the college. Roff's tenure, though a brief seven years, was characterised by an expanding voice for staff in the day-to-day management of the school, the establishment of a Foundation Office at the School under the direction of a Development Officer and the widening of the House System to provide greater depth in pastoral care. His last few years saw the school in dispute over ownership and, for the principal and his school community, it was a time of stress. In 1980 the decision was made to incorporate the school and a new Council was appointed, with representatives from the Presbyterian Church, the Old Scotch Collegians' Association and the community at large.

F. G. Donaldson, a vice principal from Wallace High School (Northern Ireland), with a PhD in atomic physics from Queen's University Belfast, succeeded Roff in 1983. Under his principalship there was a significant building program that created new facilities for the education of boys, the development of ICT for administrative and educational purposes, and enhanced pastoral care of students.

I. Tom Batty was appointed as the ninth principal of Scotch and installed into office on 14 July 2008. Prior to his appointment he was Housemaster of Villiers House, Eton College in the UK. The early years of Batty's tenure saw the introduction of a new House-based pastoral care structure in the Upper School, which began at the start of the 2011 school year.

S. H. Marsh was appointed as the tenth principal of Scotch, commencing his term in January 2023. He was previously the Headmaster of William Clarke College in Sydney.

Name

The School was originally called "The Melbourne Academy", after its location, when it opened in 1851.  In its early years it was also known as
Mr Lawson's Academy - named after the first principal, Robert Lawson
The Grammar School
The Scots' College - the college of the Scots
The Scotch College - the college that is Scottish
For a while all of these names were used concurrently until in the 1860s the usage settled on "The Scotch College", which was later shortened to be simply "Scotch College".

Coat-of-arms and motto

The School's coat-of-arms (shown above, right) features the following elements:
The Burning Bush - the Burning Bush, from the Book of Exodus, is a common symbol used by the Presbyterian Church, representing Christian faith.
A white saltire on a blue background - the flag of Scotland (St Andrew's Cross) representing the School's Scottish heritage.
The Southern Cross - the Southern Cross constellation is a common symbol for Australia, representing the School's location and home.
A crown - representing loyalty to the sovereign and legitimate government.
A lymphad or birlin - a Scottish heraldic ship with oars in use, thus rowing into the wind, and representing enterprise and perseverance.
A torch - representing the torch of knowledge and learning.

The motto of the School, shown in Scottish heraldic style in a scroll above the coat-of-arms, is Latin: "Deo Patriae Litteris".  Its meaning in English is "For God, For Country, For Learning".

Principals

Tom Batty commenced his term in 2008 and resigned in mid 2022. His successor, Scott Marsh, commenced his term in 2023.

Governance and denominational affiliation

Scotch is an incorporated body governed by a Council of seventeen members - who are directors - made up of three groups; Five Presbyterian Church of Victoria nominees (Group A), Five persons (usually Old Boys) nominated by the Old Scotch Collegians' Association (Group B), and seven persons nominated by Council from the community at large (Group C), usually with some connection with the School and the Christian church. All appointments are made annually by the Presbyterian Church from the first of December every year.

Chairmen of the Council have included Sir Arthur Robinson, Sir Archibald Glenn, Sir James Balderstone, David Crawford AO and David A. Kemp AC.

In 1977, most congregations of the Australian Presbyterian Church left the church and joined with the Methodist and Congregationalist churches in Australia to form the Uniting Church in Australia. The Presbyterian Church of Australia continued with the remaining congregations.  In the split, Scotch College, Melbourne was allocated to the Presbyterian Church of Australia by the Handley Commission which was appointed to distribute the assets of the churches, which included an even number of representatives from the Uniting Church and the continuing Presbyterian Church as well as independent commissioners. At the time the Scotch Council unsuccessfully appealed this decision.

Campuses

Sporting facilities include ovals and soccer/rugby fields, two synthetic grass hockey/soccer fields, tennis courts, an indoor swimming pool, an indoor diving pool, three gymnasiums, two weights rooms and three squash courts. As the school is situated on the banks of the Yarra River, the school has rowing and boating facilities located within its grounds.
Healesville - The school has  of forest with a lodge in the hills at Healesville east of Melbourne, used for Class Retreats, as well as Scout and Cadet camps.
Phillip Island - The school has an absolute-beach-front residential seaside property at Cowes on Phillip Island, which is the site of a one-week orientation camp for Year 7 students and other camps.

Boarding
 
Scotch has been a boarding school since its foundation. Today the School caters for 160 boarders of whom around 70% are drawn from around Australia and 30% are from overseas. The boarding precinct is on "The Hill" which overlooks the Senior School at the main Hawthorn campus.  There are three boarding houses:  School House, McMeckan House and Arthur Robinson House.  Both School House and McMeckan House were built as the gift of Anthony Mackie, and his brother and sisters, in memory of their uncle Captain James McMeckan.  Arthur Robinson House is named after a Chairman of the School Council, Sir Arthur Robinson.

Curriculum
Scotch students study towards the Victorian Certificate of Education (VCE), which is the main secondary student assessment program in Victoria which ranks students with an Australian Tertiary Admission Rank (ATAR) for university entrance purposes.

Extra-curricular activities

Some extra-curricular groups and activities at Scotch are:
Army Cadet Corps - The Scotch College Cadet Corps was established in 1884, and holds an annual Tattoo.  Cadets have weekly activities at the school and participate in camps and bivouacs.
Pipe Band - The Scotch College Pipes and Drums Band was established in 1946 and is one of the oldest school pipe bands in Australia.  It wears the Gordon tartan, and competes at national and international competitions and highland festivals.  It performs at school and public events including in the annual ANZAC Day March to the Shrine of Remembrance. It is the current national champion in the Juvenile grade. The pipe band performed on stage with Sir Paul McCartney on 5 and 6 December 2017, during his One on One tour. Sir Paul famously autographed the vellum of the bass drum on stage.
Military Band - The Military Band performs at school, and in public including in the annual ANZAC Day March to the Shrine of Remembrance and on overseas tours. All members of the band are also members of the Australian Army Cadet Corps.
1st Hawthorn (Scotch College) Scout Group - Scotch has its own Scout Group, established in 1926, that is part of Scouts Australia.  The Scout Group meets regularly each Thursday at the school and participate in off-campus activities such as camps.
Sports First Aid - A Thursday afternoon service that boys can choose to undertake to gain advanced training in first aid. Members of the service learn valuable skills such as CPR and soft and hard tissue injury management. Members help the Scotch College community by regularly attending Saturday mornings to treat any injuries suffered during sport matches. An annual camp is held at Cowes where boys practice the skills they have learned.
Debating - Scotch regularly participates in debating, competing in the Debaters Association of Victoria Schools Competition. Each season, the school hosts the Hawthorn region of the Schools Competition. In 2008 the First Debating Team were the State A Grade runners-up, while the school was also runner up in the State British Parliamentary Debating Competition. Scotch debaters have recently toured the United Kingdom participating in inter-school debating tournaments. In 2009, Scotch won the inaugural Monash Viewpoint Economics Debate. In 2010, Scotch made Victorian debating history when it won the A Grade (Year 12), B Grade (Year 11) and C Grade (Year 10) State Grand Finals in the DAV (Debaters Association of Victoria) Debating Competition.

Sport

Scotch College competes in the Associated Public Schools of Victoria (APS) league in Athletics, Badminton, Basketball, Cricket, Cross Country, Australian Rules Football, Hockey, Rowing, Rugby, Soccer, Squash, Swimming and Diving, Table Tennis, Tennis, Volleyball and Water Polo.

In addition to the APS competition, Scotch competes in a number of other sporting competitions, including:
Henley Royal Regatta - In 2017 the first crew went to Henley Royal Regatta after winning the Head of the River and Australian Rowing Championships. They won the Princess Elizabeth Challenge Cup, becoming the first Victorian crew ever to win it and the third Australian crew.  In 2019 the first crew again made the final of the Princess Elizabeth Challenge Cup, coming second to Eton College.
Cordner-Eggleston Cup - This Cup is contested each year by the first football teams of Scotch and Melbourne Grammar School. It commemorates the first recorded game of Australian Rules Football, which was played between the two schools on 7 August 1858, which ended in a 1–1 draw and is today commemorated by a statue depicting the game outside the Melbourne Cricket Ground.
The Batty Shield - This Shield is contested between the first cricket teams of Scotch and Eton College. The Shield was inaugurated in 2008 after a number of cricket tours between the schools, and is named after the ninth principal of Scotch who was previously a Housemaster at Eton, Mr I. Tom Batty.
The Tait Cup - This Cup is contested between the first cricket teams of Scotch and Geelong Grammar School and commemorates the links between the schools back to their first cricket match in 1855.
The John Roe Shield - This Shield is contested between the first soccer teams of Scotch and Saint Peter's College, Adelaide.
The Colin Bell Trophy - This Trophy is contested between the first Rugby teams of Scotch and Melbourne Grammar School which recognises the first schoolboy game of Rugby played in Victoria in 1932.

APS Premierships 
Scotch has won the following APS premierships:

 Athletics (19) - 1912, 1913, 1914, 1915, 1916, 1919, 1935, 1940, 1942, 1949, 1953, 1955, 1958, 1959, 1971, 1972, 1973, 1974, 1978
 Badminton (10) - 2004, 2005, 2006, 2007, 2008, 2011, 2012, 2013, 2014, 2015
 Basketball (3) - 1991, 1995, 2016
 Cricket (32) - 1891, 1892, 1893, 1894, 1898, 1899, 1900, 1901, 1902, 1911, 1915, 1922, 1928, 1938, 1941, 1942, 1945, 1952, 1955, 1956, 1958, 1964, 1973, 1978, 1981, 1987, 1994, 1996, 2003, 2012, 2017, 2019
 Cross Country (10) - 1992, 1994, 1995, 1998, 2000, 2001, 2002, 2003, 2005, 2021
 Football (36) - 1891, 1892, 1894, 1895, 1896, 1897, 1898, 1900, 1901, 1906, 1911, 1913, 1916, 1930, 1932, 1939, 1942, 1943, 1945, 1947, 1952, 1953, 1954, 1956, 1958, 1966, 1968, 1969, 1970, 1971, 1974, 1978, 1980, 1989, 1996, 2006
 Futsal (2) - 2016, 2017
 Hockey (10) - 1992, 1996, 1997, 1999, 2000, 2001, 2002, 2003, 2008, 2009
 Rowing (47) - 1868, 1869, 1872, 1873, 1875, 1876, 1879, 1881, 1884, 1891, 1892, 1899, 1900, 1907, 1908, 1919, 1921, 1925, 1926, 1927, 1941, 1946, 1951, 1952, 1963, 1966, 1967, 1969, 1973, 1978, 1992, 1998, 2004, 2005, 2006, 2007, 2008, 2010, 2011, 2012, 2013, 2014, 2015, 2017, 2018, 2019, 2022
 Soccer (3) - 1992, 1994, 2016
 Swimming (8) - 1990, 1991, 1992, 1993, 1994, 1995, 1996, 1997
 Swimming & Diving* (3) - 1999, 2000, 2001
 Table Tennis - 2003
 Tennis (4) - 1988, 1989, 2019, 2021
 Volleyball (2) - 2012, 2022
 Water Polo (3) - 2004, 2011, 2012

*From 1998 until 2013, swimming and diving events were awarded as a single premiership.

Alumni

Alumni of Scotch College are known as Old Boys or Old Collegians, and automatically become members of the School's alumni association, the Old Scotch Collegians' Association (OSCA).

Studies over the years have found that Scotch College had more alumni mentioned in Who's Who in Australia (a listing of notable Australians) than any other school. In 2010 The Age reported that Scotch College "has educated more of Australia's most honoured and influential citizens than any other school in the nation", based on research that revealed its alumni had received more top (Companion) Order of Australia honours than any other school. Although knighthoods are no longer bestowed in Australia, at least 71 Scotch College alumni have been knighted.

Alumni of Scotch College include
 Three Governors-General of Australia - Sir Zelman Cowen, Sir Ninian Stephen and Peter Hollingworth
Prime Minister of Australia Sir George Reid
 Four Justices of the High Court of Australia - Sir John Latham (Chief Justice), Kenneth Hayne, Sir Hayden Starke and Sir Ninian Stephen
 Eight State Premiers - Jim Bacon (Tas), John Cain (Vic), Jeff Kennett (Vic), Sir Harry Lawson (Vic), John MacPherson (Vic), Sir George Reid (NSW), William Shiels (Vic) and Vaiben Louis Solomon (SA)
Chief of the Australian Defence Force General Peter Gration
 The eponyms of two Universities - Monash University named after Sir John Monash (who features on the Australian $100 note) and Murdoch University named after Sir Walter Murdoch
  Ten University Vice-Chancellors - Sir Kenneth Wheare of Oxford University; Sir Lindsay Ride of University of Hong Kong; Sir David Derham, Sir John Monash, Sir George Paton and David Penington of the University of Melbourne; Peter Darvall and Raymond Martin of Monash University; Sir Walter Murdoch of the University of Western Australia; and Sir Zelman Cowen of the University of Queensland and University of New England
 Psychiatrist and former prisoner of war Dr John Cade AO who discovered lithium for the treatment of bipolar disorder
 Two BHP Chairmen - Sir Ian McLennan and Sir James Balderstone
 Governor of Victoria Sir Henry Winneke
 Economist and founding Chief Editor of the International Monetary Fund Allan G B Fisher
 Three times Olympic Gold Medalist Drew Ginn
 Governor of the Reserve Bank of Australia Sir Harold Knight
 Alistair Knox (1912-1980) - mudbrick house designer and builder
 Captain Robert Little, highest scoring Australian fighter ace in World War I
 Player and Head Coach of the Australian National Rugby Union Team Ewen McKenzie
 World number 1 and two times Wimbledon singles tennis champion Gerald Patterson
 Actor Jesse Spencer
 Singer-songwriter John Williamson
 Australian moral philosopher and Laureate Professor Peter Singer
 Attorney-General of Australia under the Albanese Labor Government Mark Dreyfus

Images of Hawthorn campus

See also

 List of schools in Victoria, Australia
 List of high schools in Victoria
 Victorian Certificate of Education

References

Further reading
Stuart Gerstman and James Mitchell, Visions of Boyhood - Scotch College in Pictures, Hardie Grant Books, 2007, 
Stephen Matthews, The Pipes and Drums: Scotch College Melbourne - A History, Scotch College Pipes and Drums Auxiliary, 2007, 
James Mitchell, A Deepening Roar - Scotch College, Melbourne, 1851-2001, Allen & Unwin, 2001, 
Desmond Zwar, The Soul of a School, Macmillan, 1982,

External links

 
 Scotch College, 1970-1975 website
 Encyclopedia of Melbourne website
 Organ Historical Trust of Australia web-page on Scotch College's Memorial Hall organ

Associated Public Schools of Victoria
Educational institutions established in 1851
Presbyterian schools in Australia
Private schools in Melbourne
Boarding schools in Victoria (Australia)
Member schools of the Headmasters' and Headmistresses' Conference
Boys' schools in Victoria (Australia)
Junior School Heads Association of Australia Member Schools
1851 establishments in Australia
Scottish-Australian culture
Buildings and structures in the City of Boroondara